Martti Rautio (9 March 1935 in Uusimaa, Finland – 13 December 2017) was a Canadian cross-country skier who competed in the 1964 Winter Olympics.

References

1935 births
2017 deaths
Canadian male cross-country skiers
Olympic cross-country skiers of Canada
Cross-country skiers at the 1964 Winter Olympics
Finnish emigrants to Canada
Sportspeople from Uusimaa